Lilliput is an Indian actor and writer for the TV series Vikram Vetaal and Bollywood films. His real name is M. M. Faruqui.
He adopted the screen name taking a cue from Lilliput and Blefuscu, two island nations in Jonathan Swift's novel Gulliver's Travels where Gulliver lands onto an island inhabited by little people.

Career
He is best known for writing Doordarshan's popular science fiction series Indradhanush and acted in films such as Bunty Aur Babli (2005), Saagar (1985), and popular 90s sitcoms like Dekh Bhai Dekh , Natkhat and Mr. Funtoosh, and for starring in Woh (1998) as Woh. He plays Dadda Tyagi in Famous web series Mirzapur Season 2. He made his Tamil film debut in Vijay starrer Beast.

Filmography

Film

Television

Web series

References

External links

Living people
Indian male soap opera actors
Year of birth missing (living people)